Line 1 of Shaoxing Metro is a metro line in Shaoxing.

Section
Main line (Keqiao section)
The section from Guniangqiao to China Textile City opened on 28 June 2021.

Main line (remaining section)
The section opened on 29 April 2022.

Branch line (future Line 4)
The branch line will open in 2024. The branch line will be part of Line 4 in future.

Opening timeline

Stations

Main line

Branch line
Under construction, opening in 2024

Planned
In August 21, 2021, the government announced that there will be a merge between Shaoxing Metro Line 1 and Hangzhou Metro Line 5, changing all the stations in the main line to Line 5 of the Hangzhou's metro system.

References

Shaoxing Metro
Railway lines opened in 2021
Rapid transit lines in China